The badminton men's team tournament at the 2014 Asian Games in Incheon took place from 20 September to 23 September at Gyeyang Gymnasium.

A total of ten countries entered the competition.

The final of the 2014 Incheon Asian Games on 23 September was a repeat of the Guangzhou Asian Games, with the South Korea men's team meeting China. In the end, South Korean players defeated their Chinese rivals and gained their third Asian Games men's title.

World No 2 seed Chen Long lost to seventh-ranked Son Wan-ho of South Korea 5–21, 24–22, 14–21 to hand the host a 1–0 lead in the best-of-five series. Korean doubles team made it 2–0. Five-time champion Lin Dan, eased past Lee Dong-keun of South Korea in the third, critical match. China won the second doubles match but Korea went to win the series 3–2. The bronze medal went to Malaysia and Chinese Taipei.

Schedule
All times are Korea Standard Time (UTC+09:00)

Results

Round of 16

Quarterfinals

Semifinals

Gold medal match

Non-participating athletes

References

Results

External links
Official website

Badminton at the 2014 Asian Games